The Fascist is a 1961  Italian film directed by  Luciano Salce.

It was coproduced with France. It was also the first feature film scored by Ennio Morricone.

Plot
The movie takes place in 1944, when Italy was divided between the fascist puppet state Repubblica Sociale Italiana (RSI), which retained control only of the northern half of the country, and the Allied-occupied southern half.

Fascist bosses gathered in Cremona (in the far North of Italy and well away from the line of fire) pick enthusiast militant Primo Arcovazzi (played by Ugo Tognazzi) to take into custody professor Bonafè, a noted anti-fascist philosopher and agreed upon new government leader among the opposition forces who are preparing the new democratic government after the war. During a first raid at the professor's home, Arcovazzi does not recognize him and Bonafè can escape to his family residence in rural Abruzzo. The fascist is hence appointed again to capture him there, and to lead him to Rome, momentarily still controlled by the RSI. Primo does not understand that the political situation is changing and his faction is about to lose, and is easily lured by the promise of a promotion; while for his superiors, his tardiness and naive fascist faith make him an ideal expendable candidate for the mission.

Equipped with a motorcycle-sidecar combination Arcovazzi manages to capture the professor and the two head back towards Rome. Along the way they have a small accident to avoid running over a girl (Stefania Sandrelli), who turns out to be a confidence trickster and petty thief. They share part of the way after the motorcycle is wrecked, but the girl disappears after having scammed the professor out of 150 lire.

Arcovazzi asks for assistance with his vehicle to a truckload of Wehrmacht soldiers passing by. But his sidecar gets confiscated and the two are taken prisoner by the German forces, who immediately recognize the professor for his academic fame and a have him in a Gestapo list of wanted men, due to a publication opposing the Jews'persecution.

The couple manage to escape thanks to Bonafè's ability to improvise an explosive formula, and taking advantage of confusion during an allied air raid. They don German uniforms to pass unnoticed during the commotion and get momentarily separated. Later they reunite and again, while Arcovazzi is stealing a Schwimmwagen in order to continue his mission of delivering Bonafè to fascist authorities in Rome, the professor tries in vain to desert him.

The following night the two men stop to sleep in a barn, and they meet again by chance the thieving girl. She is afraid but the trio eventually reconcile over the attempts to capture and cook a chicken for dinner.

In the morning the girl wakes up first and leaves with all of Arcovazzi's and Bonafè's clothes and accessories, except for their Schwimmwagen. Depressed by the events but still faithful to his mission, Arcovazzi tries to continue. He attempts to ford a stream, trusting in the Schwimmwagen's amphibious qualities but, due to previous damage or his own ineptitude, the vehicle sinks.

Upon eventually reaching a village on foot, Arcovazzi tries to ask for help at the local fascist party cell ("Casa del Fascio"). The place is however deserted, and the only people around are a couple of teenagers, armed and brain-washed by fascist propaganda. Arcovazzi is questioned to prove his knowledge of fascist lore, and kept at gun point until able to prove his trustworthiness. Only professor Bonafè's help in answering the last question allows him to answer the last challenge and to avoid being shot. But even after gaining the teenagers' trust, there is no support to be had and Arcovazzi is only able to confiscating a tandem bicycle and a pistol, again to resume his struggle of delivering Bonafè as prisoner in Rome.

Again the duo has to stop when bursting a tire, in the neighborhood of the town of Rocca Sabina. Arcovazzi recognizes it as the home of (fictitious) nationalist poet Arcangelo Bardacci, whom he idolizes and whose writings (which he can quote verbatim) prompted him to become a fascist. Upon reaching the poet's house, he is told however that the poet had joined the Royal Italian Army in Albania and perished in the struggle. In reality Bardacci is alive and hiding in the house, biding his time hiding in the cellar until the regime he once endorsed finally collapses.

Arcovazzi is oblivious to the false tale and accepts hospitality in the poet's house, while Bonafè discovers the truth and is allowed to escape in exchange of a promise to assist with Bardacci's political rehabilitation in the future. Despite the head start, Arcovazzi however manages to catch once again his prisoner, and resumes the voyage towards Rome with his captive.
For a while the two can travel on a methane powered pullman, but during one of the frequent stops the professor escapes once again. By the time Arcovazzi manages to recapture him, the pullman is long gone and again they must walk, eventually reaching the outskirts of Rome in the dusk hours of early June, 1944.

Unbeknown to them the Italian Capital has just been conquered by the Allies. As they walk, they see increasing signs of the mutated situation, with groups of GIs celebrating their victory, whom Arcovazzi mistakes for war prisoners. Upon meeting once again the young girl, he demands back his clothes but gladly accepts her "even better" mocking offer of a full fascist "Federale" uniform, anticipating his promotion for successful delivery of Bonafè as prisoner.

Despite his new uniform, Arcovazzi is initially just mocked by the U.S. troops that they meet further on within the capital, contrary to fascist propaganda which maintained all allied soldiers were bloodthirsty brutes. He is still continuing his attempt to complete the mission in an increased state of confusion, when he is spotted instead by Italian resistance fighters of the Comitato di Liberazione Nazionale that are also convening into the city. Together with other civilians, they attack Arcovazzi who is about to be lynched by the people. Only Bonafè saves his captor, pretending to shoot him but in reality throwing away his uniform and offering his jacket to allow him to hide his compromised political affiliation. Arcovazzi is let go ("You're free now, even if you don't like freedom"), while the professor joins the resistance leaders to prepare a post-war free government.

Cast
Ugo Tognazzi as Primo Arcovazzi
 Georges Wilson as Professor Erminio Bonafè
 Stefania Sandrelli as Lisa
 Gianrico Tedeschi: Arcangelo Bardacci
 Elsa Vazzoler as Matilde Bardacci 
 Gianni Agus as Head of the beam of Cremona
 Luciano Salce as German Lieutenant
 Renzo Palmer as Partisan Taddei

Reception

John Simon of the National Review called Il federale "one of my favorite films of all time".

See also
 Military history of Italy during World War II 
 Allied invasion of Italy
 Rome, Open City, Paisà, General della Rovere, Violent Summer, Long Night in 1943, Escape by Night, Two Women, Everybody Go Home, The Four Days of Naples, Salò o le 120 giornate di Sodoma

References

External links 
 

1961 films
1960s Italian-language films
1961 comedy films
Italian Campaign of World War II films
Commedia all'italiana
Italian black-and-white films
Films set in Italy
Films about fascists
Films directed by Luciano Salce
Films scored by Ennio Morricone
Films set in 1944
Films set in Rome
Films produced by Dino De Laurentiis
1960s Italian films